The 1971 Chicago White Sox season was their 72nd season overall and 71st in the American League. They finished with a record of 79–83.

Offseason 
 December 31, 1970: Chuck Hartenstein was purchased by the White Sox from the Boston Red Sox.
 March 29, 1971: Tommy McCraw was traded by the White Sox to the Washington Senators for Ed Stroud.
 March 31, 1971: Duane Josephson and Danny Murphy were traded by the White Sox to the Boston Red Sox for Tony Muser and Vicente Romo.

Regular season

Season standings

Record vs. opponents

Opening Day lineup 
 Lee Richard, SS
 Jay Johnstone, CF
 Mike Andrews, 2B
 Bill Melton, 3B
 Carlos May, 1B
 Rick Reichardt, LF
 Walt Williams, RF
 Ed Herrmann, C
 Tommy John, P

Notable transactions 
 June 8, 1971: 1971 Major League Baseball Draft
 Warren Cromartie was drafted by the White Sox in the 7th round, but did not sign.
 Jeff Holly was drafted by the White Sox in the 17th round.
 July 7, 1971: Lee Maye was released by the White Sox.
 August 6, 1971: Joe Henderson was acquired by the White Sox from the Algodoneros de Union Laguna of the Mexican League.

Roster

Player stats

Batting 
Note: G = Games played; AB = At bats; R = Runs scored; H = Hits; 2B = Doubles; 3B = Triples; HR = Home runs; RBI = Runs batted in; BB = Base on balls; SO = Strikeouts; AVG = Batting average; SB = Stolen bases

Pitching 
Note: W = Wins; L = Losses; ERA = Earned run average; G = Games pitched; GS = Games started; SV = Saves; IP = Innings pitched; H = Hits allowed; R = Runs allowed; ER = Earned runs allowed; HR = Home runs allowed; BB = Walks allowed; K = Strikeouts

Farm system

Notes

References 
 
 1971 Chicago White Sox at Baseball Reference

Chicago White Sox seasons
Chicago White Sox season
Chicago